Tiao may refer to:

People
 Diao or Tiao, a Chinese surname
 Xie Tiao (464-499), Chinese poet
 Tião (basketball) (1925-unknown), full name Sebastião Amorim Gimenez, Brazilian basketball player
 Tião Macalé (1926-1993), Brazilian comedian
 Tião Macalé (footballer) (1936-1972), Brazilian football midfielder
 Tião (footballer, born 1936), full name Sebastião Pereira dos Santos, Brazilian football forward
 Tião (footballer, born 1948), full name Sebastião Carlos da Silva, Brazilian football forward
 Luc-Adolphe Tiao (born 1954), Burkinabé politician and former Prime Minister
 Tião Carreiro ( 1958-1993), member of Brazilian musical duo
 Tião Viana (born 1961), Brazilian doctor and politician
 Will Tiao (born 1973), American actor and producer

See also
 Tiao-kuai, Chinese system
 Padre Tião (1965-1966), Brazilian telenovela
 Macaco Tião (1963-1996), Brazilian chimpanzee
 Tião (dolphin) ( 1994), a Brazilian dolphin